Maganti Murali Mohan (born 24 June 1940) is an Indian actor, producer, politician, and business executive from Telugu cinema. In 1973, Murali Mohan debuted in Jagame Maya, produced by Atluri Poornachandra Rao. He gained recognition with the 1974 film Tirupati, directed by Dasari Narayana Rao.
He has acted in over 350 feature films. He has served in various positions in the National Film Development Corporation (NFDC) and the Andhra Pradesh Film Development Corporation. He was the Honorary President of the Telugu Movie Artists Association until the elections in 2015.

In 1980 he formed his own film production company, Jayabheri Arts, with his brother Kishore. His first film as producer was Varala Abbay, directed by Raja Chandra. This was Murali Mohan's 100th film. The company produced 25 films, which include the blockbuster film Athadu. He won three Nandi Awards.

He is the Chairman of the construction company Jayabheri Group. He has also been active in politics for the Telugu Desam Party. He contested in the 15th Loksabha elections in 2009 as the TDP candidate from Rajahmundry parliamentary constituency of Andhra Pradesh, which eventually lost to the Indian National Congress candidate Vundavalli Aruna Kumar by just 2,147 votes. In 2014, he won the 16th Loksabha elections as a member of Parliament from Rajahmundry.

Personal life 
Maganti Murali Mohan was born on 24 June 1940 in Chataparru to Maganti Madhava Rao, an Indian freedom fighter. He did his schooling in Eluru. He shifted gears in 1963 and started his own business dealing in electrical motors and oil engines. He then ventured into stage acting in Vijayawada.

Murali Mohan is married to Vijaya Lakshmi, with whom he has a daughter, Madhu Bindhu, and a son Ram Mohan.

Philanthropy 
The Murali Mohan Charitable Trust provides free education for people who secure 85% in both SSC and intermediate and below 10,000 rank in EAMCET or any other preferred entrance tests. The students will be taken into consideration only after full-fledged screening for their financial status and community. The trust is focused on encouraging students of any community who are financially poor. Since its inception the trust has adopted nearly 10,000 students of engineering and medicine.

Filmography

Television

Awards
Nandi Awards
Best Actor - O Thandri Theerpu (1985)
Best Supporting Actor - Preminchu (2001)
Best Supporting Actor - Vegu Chukkalu (2003)
Others

 SIIMA Lifetime Achievement Award - 2017

References 

1940 births
Living people
People from West Godavari district
Film producers from Andhra Pradesh
Telugu Desam Party politicians
Indian male film actors
Telugu male actors
Nandi Award winners
Filmfare Awards South winners
India MPs 2014–2019
Lok Sabha members from Andhra Pradesh
Indian actor-politicians
Telugu politicians
20th-century Indian male actors
Male actors in Telugu cinema
21st-century Indian male actors
Santosham Film Awards winners
People from Rajahmundry
Male actors from Rajahmundry
South Indian International Movie Awards winners